"Tie My Pecker To My Leg" is a song by Mojo Nixon.  It is a very crude song that Mojo Nixon plays at almost every live performance.  According to an Artist Direct review of Whereabouts Unknown, "Tie My Pecker to my Leg" was Mojo Nixon's bawdiest song up to that point is his career.  It was co-written with lead Beat Farmer Country Dick Montana.  Besides mentioning bestiality and sitophilia, "Tie My Pecker to My Leg" also mentions geriatric sex and coprophilia.

Origins of refrain
"The Old Chisholm Trail" is a well-known cowboy song.  In all versions of the song, the refrain was:
Come-a ti yi yupi, yupi ya, yupi ya
Come-a ti yi yupi, yupi ya

Ed Cray in "The Erotic Muse" credits a variation of these lyrics to high school and college students in southern California:

Gonna tie my pecker to my leg, to my leg
Gonna tie my pecker to my leg

Other versions
There is also Vietnam era version sung to "exert some control over the penis" of "Tie My Pecker to my Leg."

References

1995 songs
Comedy songs
Novelty songs